Clarine Coffin Grenfell (December 31, 1910 – September 7, 2004) was an American poet, writer, and teacher.

Education
Grenfell graduated from University of Maine in Orono, in 1932, where she was the Class Poet for 1932 and also became a member of the Phi Mu Sorority. She graduated from the Hartford Theological Seminary on May 28, 1938, with a Bachelor of Divinity.

Grenfell was an active member of the Alumni Association of the University of Maine and wrote the Golden Bears column for Maine Alumni Magazine from 1996 to 2002. In 2002, the University of Maine awarded her an honorary Doctor of Humane Letters.

Teaching
Grenfell's teaching career began at the age of 17 in Herman, Maine. She later taught at many other schools in Bangor, Maine, and Bethel, Woodbury, Bloomfield, West Hartford, and Westport, Connecticut. She chaired the English Department at schools including Hall High School in West Hartford, Connecticut.

Grenfell retired from teaching English in 1980, but continued to teach in other capacities, such as teaching a class called "Writing a Life Story – Yours and Mine" at more than sixty Elderhostels.

Ministry
Grenfell was an active church member, supply pastor, and licensed local preacher in the United Methodist Church. She preached when young in the churches in Dixmont and Hermon, Maine, and in later years conducted many weddings and funerals, taught in Christian education programs, and wrote and directed church plays and pageants. She was the coordinator of Steeple People, a campaign to restore the steeple of the Orland United Methodist Church. Additional materials about Dr. Grenfell are available through the United Methodist Archives Center at Drew University.

Writing and editing

Grenfell worked as an editor and reading consultant for the Educational Division of Reader's Digest and as a reading consultant for the state of Connecticut. After retiring from teaching in 1980, Grenfell founded a small publishing house, the Grenfell Reading Center, publishing books by Maine authors, inspirational books, and her own memoirs and poetry. Several of the poems in her books had already been printed in other publications, including the Bangor Daily News and the Hartford Courant. Grenfell traveled extensively throughout the US, giving lectures and reading from her works.
She was one of the founders of the Maine Christian Writers Conference.

The 'Inside' Story
Grenfell's most famous short story concerns the wedding of Marian Anderson in July 1943. The wedding was a private ceremony performed by Grenfell's husband, the Reverend Jack Grenfell, who was at that time the pastor of the Bethel United Methodist Church in Bethel, Connecticut. Miss Anderson wanted her wedding to be kept private, and so Rev. Grenfell originally arranged to conduct the ceremony in the parsonage instead of the church. At the last minute, however, the location of the ceremony was changed to the Elmwood Chapel on the site of the Elmwood Cemetery.

"The 'Inside' Story" is a comedic behind-the-scenes account of events surrounding the wedding from the perspective of the minister's wife. The story relates young Clarine's frantic attempts to decorate the living room of the parsonage for Anderson's wedding ceremony and her efforts to fend off reporters during and after the ceremony in order to protect Miss Anderson's privacy. The story was published in Grenfell's second book, "Women My Husband Married". It became so popular with readers that later editions of the book included the subtitle "including Marian Anderson."

Grenfell Poetry Prize
In 1990, Grenfell celebrated her 80th birthday by establishing the Grenfell Poetry Prize to recognize outstanding student poets at the University of Maine. Past judges include Annie Finch and Leonore Hildebrandt.

Personal life
Clarine Coffin was born in Bangor, Maine, to Millard Fillmore Coffin and Clara B. Kelley Coffin. One of six children, she lived in Bangor throughout her childhood and college years. She moved to Connecticut to attend Hartford Theological Seminary, where she met her future husband, the Rev. Jack Grenfell. Jack Grenfell, the son of Rev. Thomas and Ethel (Rowe) Grenfell, was born in St. Just, Cornwall, but moved with his family to the United States in 1912 as a young boy.

Clarine Coffin and Jack Grenfell announced their engagement in 1937. At that time, Clarine was serving the Methodist Church in Dixmont, Maine, and Jack was serving the Trinity Methodist Church in Bridgeport, Connecticut. They were married on June 28, 1938, by the groom's father, Rev. Thomas Grenfell. They had three children: the Rev. Dr. John Millard Grenfell, the Rev. Lornagrace Thomas Grenfell, and Pamela Grenfell Smith.

Rev. Jack Grenfell died on July 2, 1980, in Orland, Maine. Clarine never remarried, remaining a widow for more than 24 years until her death in Bangor, Maine, on September 7, 2004, at age 93. Clarine and Jack Grenfell are both buried in Mount Hope Cemetery in Bangor.

Honors
 Phi Beta Kappa
 Grenfell was made a member of the Augusta Evans Wilson Literary Society, which was established to recognize members of Phi Mu who are published authors of books with an assigned ISBN number.
 Grenfell was awarded a Doctorate in Humane Letters by the University of Maine in 2002 at the age of 91. At that time, her health had declined and she was therefore unable to travel to Orono for the commencement ceremony, so University of Maine President Peter S. Hoff made a rare exception to the university policy against conferring honorary degrees in absentia and traveled to Orland to confer the degree on Grenfell in a special hooding ceremony.

Bibliography

References

External links
 Clarine Coffin Grenfell obituary in Bangor Daily News
 
 Clarine Coffin Grenfell Papers, Special Collections, Raymond H. Fogler Library, University of Maine

1910 births
2004 deaths
American women poets
Writers from Bangor, Maine
University of Maine alumni
Burials at Mount Hope Cemetery (Bangor, Maine)
20th-century American poets
20th-century American women writers
People from Orland, Maine
21st-century American women